Henri Léon Marie-Thérèse Pousseur (23 June 1929 – 6 March 2009) was a Belgian classical composer, teacher, and music theorist.

Biography
Pousseur was born in Malmedy and studied at the Academies of Music in Liège and in Brussels from 1947 to 1952, where he joined the group called Variations associated with Pierre Froidebise. It was in this group that he first became familiar with the music of Anton Webern and other 20th-century composers. During his period of military service in 1952–53 at Malines, he maintained close contact with André Souris. He encountered Pierre Boulez in 1951 at Royaumont, and this contact inspired his Trois chants sacrés, composed that same year. In 1953, he met Karlheinz Stockhausen, and in 1956 Luciano Berio. A less-well-known influence from his early years was the powerful impression of listening to the music of Anton Bruckner, and he maintained a lifelong interest in medieval and Renaissance music, as well as in extra-European music and their practices.

In 1954, Pousseur married Théa Schoonbrood, with whom he had four children: Isabelle (1957), Denis (1958),  (1961), and Hélène (1965).

Beginning in 1960, he collaborated with Michel Butor on a number of projects, most notably the opera Votre Faust (1960–68).

Pousseur taught in Cologne, Basel, and in the United States at SUNY Buffalo, as well as in his native Belgium. He died in Brussels, aged 79, on the morning of 6 March 2009, of bronchial pneumonia.

Compositional style and techniques
Generally regarded as a member of the Darmstadt School in the 1950s, Pousseur's music employs serialism, as well as mobile and aleatory forms, often mediating between or among seemingly irreconcilable styles, such as those of Schubert and Webern (Votre Faust). From the 1960's, Pousseur sought to develop his own serial style (to allow 'tonal' harmonies), and this can be heard in his orchestral composition Couleurs croisées (1967), which is based on the protest song We shall overcome.

His electronic composition Scambi (Exchanges), realized at the Studio di Fonologia in Milan in 1957, is unusual in the tape-music medium because it is explicitly meant to be assembled in different ways before listening. When first created, several different versions were realized, two by Luciano Berio, one by Marc Wilkinson, and two by the composer himself. Since 2004, the Scambi Project, directed by John Dack at the Lansdown Centre for Electronic Arts at Middlesex University, has focused on this work and its multiple possibilities for realization.

In addition to his compositional and teaching activities, Pousseur published many articles and ten books on music, amongst which are Fragments Théorique I: sur la musique expérimentale (Brussels: Université Libre de Bruxelles, 1970), Schumann le Poète: 25 moments d'une lecture de Dichterliebe (Paris: Klincksieck, 1993), and Musiques croisées (Paris: L'Harmattan, 1997). In 2004, two volumes of his collected writings, selected and edited by Pascal Decroupet, were issued by the Belgian publisher Pierre Mardaga Pousseau. He also published the first French translation of the writings of Alban Berg.

Selected compositions
 Sept Versets des Psaumes de la Pénitence for four vocal soloists or mixed choir (1950)
 Trois Chants sacrés for soprano and string trio (1951)
 Prospection for three pianos tuned in sixths of a tone (1952–53)
 Séismogrammes electronic music (1954)
 Symphonies à 15 Solistes (1954–55)
 Quintette à la memoire d'Anton Webern for clarinet, bass clarinet, violin, cello, and piano (1955)
 Scambi electronic music (1957)
 Mobile for two pianos (1957–58)
 Rimes pour différentes sources sonores for orchestra and tape (1958)
 Madrigal I for clarinet (1958)
 Ode for string quartet (1960–61)
 Madrigal II for four early instruments (flute, violin, viola da gamba, harpsichord) (1961)
 Trois Visages de Liège electronic music (1961)
 Caractères for piano (1961)
 Madrigal III for clarinet, violin, cello, 2 percussionists, and piano (1962)
 Votre Faust (1960–68), opera for five actors, four singers, thirteen instruments, and electronic music, libretto by Michel Butor. Several "satellite" works are related to this opera:
 Miroir de Votre Faust (Caractères II) for solo piano and (optional) soprano (1964–65)
 Jeu de Miroirs de Votre Faust for piano, soprano and tape (1964–65)
 Echos de Votre Faust for mezzo-soprano, flute, cello, and piano (1961–69)
 Les Ruines de Jéruzona for mixed choir and "rhythm section" (1978)
 La Passion selon Guignol for amplified vocal quartet and orchestra (1981)
 Parade de Votre Faust for orchestra (1974)
 Aiguillages au carrefour des immortels for 16 or 17 instruments (2002)
 Il sogno di Leporello: Parade 2 (de Votre Faust) for orchestra (2005)
 Apostrophe et six Réflexions for piano (1964–66)
 Phonèmes pour Cathy for mezzo-soprano solo (1966)
 Couleurs croisées for large orchestra (1967)
 Mnémosyne monody solo voice or instrument, or unison choir (1968)
 Mnémosyne II for variable media (1969)
 Les Éphémérides d'Icare 2 for a soloist, three-part concertino, and four instrumental quartets (1970)
 Crosses of Crossed Colors for vocal soloist, two to five pianos, six tape-recorder operators, two turntablists, and two radio operators (1970)
 Paraboles-Mix electronic music (1972)
 Vue sur les Jardins interdits for saxophone quartet (1973)
 Die Erprobung des Petrus Hebraïcus chamber opera in three acts, libretto by Léo Wintgens after Michel Butor (1974). Several "satellite" works are related to this opera:
 Chroniques berlinoises for piano and string quartet with baritone ad lib. (1975)
 Chroniques illustrées for large orchestra with baritone ad lib. (1976)
 Ballade berlinoise for piano solo (1977)
 Humeurs du Futur quotidien for two reciters and chamber orchestra (1978)
 Pédigrée for female voice and seven instruments (1980)
 Chroniques canines, for two pianos with soprano voice ad lib. (1984)
 Canines for voice and piano (1980)
 Flexions IV for viola solo (1980)
 La Seconde Apothéose de Rameau for 21 instruments (1981)
 Chroniques canines for two pianos with soprano ad lib (1984)
 Tales and Songs from the Bible of Hell four singers with real-time electronic transformation and pre-recorded 4 track tape (1979)
 La Passion selon Guignol for amplified vocal quartet and orchestra (1981)
 La Paganania for solo violin (1982)
 La Paganania seconda for solo cello (1982)
 Traverser la Forêt (1987)
 Déclarations d'Orage for reciter, soprano, baritone, three improvising instruments (alto saxophone, tuba, synthesizer), large orchestra and tape (1988–89)
 At Moonlight, Dowland's Shadow passes along Ginkaku-Ji for shakuhachi, shamisen, and koto (1989)
 Leçons d'Enfer music theatre for 2 actors, 3 singers, 7 instruments, tape, and live electronics; texts by Arthur Rimbaud and Michel Butor (1990–91)
 Dichterliebesreigentraum for soprano, baritone, two solo pianos, choir and orchestra (1992–93)
 Aquarius-Mémorial (in memoriam Karel Goeyvaerts)
 Les Litanies d'Icare for piano (1994)
 Danseurs Gnidiens cherchant la Perle clémentine for chamber orchestra (1998)
 Les Fouilles de Jéruzona for orchestra (1995)
 Icare au Jardin du Verseau for piano and chamber orchestra (1999)
 La Guirlande de Pierre for soprano, baritone and piano (1997)
 Navigations for harp (2000)
 Seize Paysages planétaires ethno-electroacoustical music (2000)
 Les Icare africains for solo voices, ad lib. choir, and orchestra (2002)
 Stèle à la mémoire de Pierre Froidebise for solo clarinet (2009), unfinished at the composer's death, completed and premiered by Jean-Pierre Peuvion

References

Cited sources

External links
 Composer's website
 Scambi Project 
 
 Henri Pousseur: A leap into the void
 Koninklijk Conservatorium Brussel now houses most works and manuscripts of Pousseur, after the bankruptcy of CeBeDeM in 2015.

1929 births
2009 deaths
People from Malmedy
Belgian classical composers
Belgian male classical composers
Deaths from bronchopneumonia
Infectious disease deaths in Belgium
20th-century classical composers
21st-century classical composers
Twelve-tone and serial composers
Walloon people
Academic staff of the Royal Conservatory of Liège
20th-century Belgian male musicians
21st-century male musicians
Harmonia Mundi artists
Sub Rosa Records artists
University at Buffalo faculty